Arnaud Clément was the defending champion but lost in the second round to Xavier Malisse.

Ivan Ljubičić won in the final 6–3, 6–2 against Younes El Aynaoui.

Seeds

Draw

Finals

Top half

Bottom half

References
 2001 Grand Prix de Tennis de Lyon Main Draw
 2001 Grand Prix de Tennis de Lyon Qualifying Draw

Singles
Singles